Sidney Nathan Ramin (January 22, 1919 – July 1, 2019) was an American orchestrator, arranger, and composer.

Life
Sidney Nathan Ramin (or Sidney Norton Ramin), born in 1919, was the son of Russian-born Ezra Ramin, a window trimmer, and Beatrice D. (Salamoff) Ramin. He grew up in Roxbury neighborhood.

Ramin orchestrated many television, film, and theatrical productions. He also composed the theme and lyrics for "Smile, You're on Candid Camera" of the hidden camera television program Candid Camera in the 1960s. In his early years, Ramin frequently collaborated with arranger Robert Ginzler, most notably on Gypsy. With Leonard Bernstein and Irwin Kostal, he co-orchestrated the music for West Side Story. He was the writer of the song "Music to Watch Girls By", first released as an instrumental single in 1967 by The Bob Crewe Generation.

Ramin married Gloria Breit, a singer and model, on January 9, 1949. They had one son, Ronald "Ron" Ramin, who also works as a composer.

Ramin celebrated his 100th birthday on January 22, 2019 and died on July 1 of the same year.

Awards
Ramin won several professional awards throughout his career.
 1961: Academy Award – Best Music, Scoring of a Musical Picture, West Side Story
 1961: Grammy Award – Best Soundtrack Album or Recording of Original Cast from Motion Picture or Television, West Side Story
 1983: Daytime Emmy Award – Co-winner for Outstanding Achievement in Design Excellence for a Daytime Drama Series, All My Children

Professional works

Television
 Gypsy (1993 television movie)
 Miracle on 34th Street (1973 television movie)
 The Patty Duke Show (co-wrote theme)
 Candid Camera
 The Milton Berle Show

Film
 West Side Story (1961)
 Too Many Thieves (1967)
 Stiletto (1969)

Theatre

 Wonderful Town, Broadway, 1953
 West Side Story, Broadway, 1957
 Say, Darling, Broadway, 1958
 Gypsy, Broadway, 1959
 The Girls Against the Boys, Broadway, 1959
 Vintage '60, Broadway, 1960
 Wildcat, Broadway, 1960
 The Conquering Hero, Broadway, 1961
 Kwamina, Broadway, 1961
 I Can Get It for You Wholesale, Broadway, 1962
 A Funny Thing Happened on the Way to the Forum, Broadway, 1962
 Sophie, Broadway, 1963
 Look Where I'm At!, Off-Broadway, 1971
 1600 Pennsylvania Avenue, Broadway, 1976
 Smile, Broadway, 1986
 Jerome Robbins' Broadway, Broadway, 1989
 Crazy for You, Broadway, 1992
 The Red Shoes, Broadway, 1993

References

External links

Sid Ramin Papers at the Rare Book and Manuscript Library, Columbia University, New York, NY

1919 births
2019 deaths
20th-century American composers
United States Army personnel of World War II
American centenarians
American film score composers
American music arrangers
American television composers
American people of Russian descent
Best Original Music Score Academy Award winners
Emmy Award winners
Grammy Award winners
American male film score composers
Male television composers
Musicians from Boston
RCA Victor artists
20th-century American male musicians
Men centenarians